This list of the tallest statues in the Sri Lanka includes free-standing, completed statues in the Sri Lanka that are at least  tall. The height of these statues are measured from the top of its base/pedestal up to its maximum height (including monuments with spires or obelisks).

Existing statues 

Under construction 

References

Tallest,Sri Lanka
Landmarks in Sri Lanka
Tourism in Sri Lanka
Statues
Statues in Sri Lanka
Statues